Breynia vredenburgi is a species of sea urchins of the Family Loveniidae. Their armour is covered with spines. Breynia vredenburgi was first scientifically described in 1907 by Anderson.

See also 

 Breynia desorii
 Breynia elegans
 Breynia neanika

References 

Spatangoida